Vier ernste Gesänge (Four Serious Songs), Op. 121, is a cycle of four songs for bass and piano by Johannes Brahms. As in his Ein deutsches Requiem, the texts are compiled from the Luther Bible. Three songs deal with death and the transience of life, while the fourth has an outlook of faith, hope and charity. Brahms composed the work in Vienna in 1896 and dedicated it to Max Klinger. The songs were premiered there in the presence of the composer by baritone Anton Sistermans and pianist Coenraad V. Bos. They have been recorded often by both female and male singers.

History 
Between 1865 and 1868, as a young man, Brahms had composed Ein deutsches Requiem (A German Requiem), dealing with death, based on a compilation of biblical quotations in Luther's translation. He wrote Vier ernste Gesänge late in life, again on words from the Bible. His friend Clara Schumann had suffered a stroke on 26March 1896. Brahms completed the composition of this set of songs, his last, by his birthday on 7 May that year, in anticipation of her death.

Sources 
The texts of the first three songs are taken from the Old Testament and deal with death, the transience of life and oppression. The text of the fourth song is taken from the New Testament and is focused on faith, hope and charity.

The original titles:

 Denn es gehet dem Menschen wie dem Vieh (Prediger Salomo, Kap. 3)
 Ich wandte mich, und sahe an (Prediger Salomo, Kap. 4)
 O Tod, wie bitter bist du (Jesus Sirach, Kap. 41)
 Wenn ich mit Menschen- und mit Engelszungen (S. Pauli an die Corinther I., Kap. 13)

The Bible sources:

 Denn es gehet dem Menschen (It is for a person as it is for an animal) from Ecclesiastes
 Ich wandte mich, und sahe an (I turned and looked upon everyone) from Ecclesiastes
 O Tod, wie bitter bist du (O death, how bitter you are) from Sirach
 Wenn ich mit Menschen (If I speak with the tongues of humans and angels) from First Epistle to the Corinthians

The songs were published by Simrock in 1896. Brahms dedicated them to Max Klinger. Written for a low voice, they were also transcribed for high voice. They have been orchestrated by Detlev Glanert (whose orchestration adds linking preludes) and Günter Raphael.

Premiere 
The first performance was given in Vienna on 9 November 1896 in the presence of the composer, by two Dutch artists: the baritone Anton Sistermans and the 20-year-old pianist Coenraad V. Bos. Brahms came backstage and thanked Sistermans and Bos for the performance, which he said "perfectly realised [his] intentions".

Two weeks later, Bos accompanied Raimund von zur-Mühlen in the four songs.  Zur-Mühlen could not achieve the final diminuendo as marked in the score, so he instructed Bos to continue the crescendo after the vocal line finished and end the work  rather than the  that Brahms had indicated. Later, zur-Mühlen spoke to Brahms and said he hoped he didn't mind this diversion from the score.  Brahms replied "You sang them magnificently. I did not notice anything wrong".

Structure 

In the following table, the key is that of the original composition, marking and time are also given. The links to separate scores provide the version for high voice.

{| class="wikitable plainrowheaders"
|-
! scope="col" | No.
! scope="col" | Beginning of text
! scope="col" | Marking
! scope="col" | Key
! scope="col" | Time
! scope="col" | Score
! scope="col" | Analysis
|-
! scope="row" | 1
| Denn es gehet dem Menschen
| Andante
| D minor
| 
| 
| Analysis of song 1
|-
! scope="row" | 2
| Ich wandte mich, und sahe an
| Andante
| G minor
| 
| 
| Analysis of song 2
|-
! scope="row" | 3
| O Tod, wie bitter bist du
| Grave
| E minor
| 
| 
| Analysis of song 3
|-
! scope="row" | 4
| Wenn ich mit Menschen
| Andante con moto et anima
| E major
| 
| 
| Analysis of song 4
|}

Recordings 

Kathleen Ferrier recorded Vier ernste Gesänge in 1947 with pianist Phyllis Spurr, and in 1950 with John Newmark. A reviewer commented in Gramophone:

In a 1949 live broadcast from the Royal Albert Hall, she sang an orchestrated version in English with the BBC Symphony Orchestra, conducted by Malcolm Sargent.

Hans Hotter recorded the songs in 1951 with pianist Gerald Moore, along with other songs by Brahms and the Bach cantata BWV 82:

Dietrich Fischer-Dieskau recorded the songs several times, beginning in 1949 in his first recording with Deutsche Grammophon, accompanied by Hertha Klust. Anne Ozorio described it as "...another seminal moment in song history. The singer had barely turned 24 but already captured the profundity of Brahms’ meditation on death". He recorded them with Daniel Barenboim in March 1972 (449 633–2) and again with Jörg Demus. Christian Gerhaher and pianist Gerold Huber recorded the songs in 2002.

Helen Traubel recorded the songs in 1949 with pianist Coenraad V. Bos.

Teddy Tahu Rhodes recorded the Glanert orchestration on his album Serious Songs in 2011 with the Tasmanian Symphony Orchestra under Sebastian Lang-Lessing for ABC Classics.

References

Further reading

External links 
 
 Vier ernste Gesänge (Four serious songs) text and translations at the LiederNet Archive

Song cycles by Johannes Brahms
1896 compositions
Songs about death
Classical song cycles in German